The  is a compact crossover SUV produced by the Japanese automobile manufacturer Toyota. Considered the first ever compact crossover SUV, it made its debut in Japan and Europe in 1994, and in North America in 1995, being launched in January 1996. The vehicle was designed for consumers wanting a vehicle that had most of the benefits of SUVs, such as increased cargo room, higher visibility, and the option of full-time four-wheel drive, along with the manoeuvrability and fuel economy of a compact car. The vehicle's name is an abbreviation of "Recreational Active Vehicle with 4-wheel drive", or "Robust Accurate Vehicle with 4-wheel drive", although not all models come equipped with the four-wheel drive system.

For the third-generation model, Toyota offered both short- and long-wheelbase versions of the RAV4. Short-wheelbase versions were sold in Japan and Europe; long-wheelbase versions in Australia and North America. RAV4 for the Japanese market were sold at two different Toyota dealership chains, Corolla Store and Netz.

In 2019, the RAV4 was the best-selling SUV of any type in the world, and the fourth best-selling passenger car overall. North America is the largest market, with 535,000 units sold in 2019, followed by Europe (133,000) and China (127,000). By February 2020, a total of 10 million RAV4s had been sold globally.

First generation (XA10; 1994) 

The first-generation RAV4, known as the XA10 series, was constructed on a unique platform that shared Carina and Corolla elements. It launched in Japan in May 1994. Design and development commenced in 1989 under code-name 153T, with design approval and start of production development in the second half of 1991 on the 3-door version and in 1993 for the 5-door version. In March 1995, the 5-door was launched and introduced to the US in January 1996, with standard dual airbags.

The XA10 series was available in both three and five door versions. In the US, a 2.0-litre straight-four producing  was available. Both front-wheel drive and four-wheel drive were available, and the RAV4 could be had with either a five-speed manual or four-speed automatic transmission. It was named the 1997 Automobile of the Year by Automobile Magazine. The 1996-1997 model years had headlamps with a bracket push in type, dual filament bulb. The front running/turn signal lamps used older round socket dual filament bulbs. The rear used round socket type bulbs as well. In 1997 for the 1998 model year, the RAV4 was slightly restyled on the front and rear fascias, and a soft top three-door was made available. In June 1999, the two-door hardtop was dropped from the American lineup, leaving the five-door and soft top models. The 1998-2000 models used a single filament headlamp, with two different beams per housing (low and high beam) opposed to the original single beam with dual filaments. The rear lamps use the more modern rectangular style bulbs (7440/7443). The interior has subtle changes such as different colored seats, different colored door panels, extra cup holders on certain models (cigarette lighter/cup holder duo), and a digital odometer. Some variants of the 1998 Toyota RAV4 were labeled as SXA11 rather than XA10, paired with an owner-given name of "RAV 4.1".

RAV4 EV 

The RAV4 EV is a plug-in, all-electric variant of the RAV4. Produced from 1997 to 2003 for fleet lease, this "zero emission" model was only offered for public sale for seven months in 2002, in very small quantities in California. A total of 1,484 units were leased and/or sold in California, and as of mid-2012, almost 500 units were still in use.

Facelift

Second generation (XA20; 2000) 

The second generation RAV4, known as the XA20 series, went on sale in July 2000. Like the previous model, the XA20 was available in three- and five-door configurations and was constructed on a platform that shared Carina and Corolla elements. Development began in 1995, with a design freeze in the first half of 1998. Styling was done at Calty Design Research Incorporated (also simply known as Calty) by Yasuhide Hosoda and Kevin Hunter from 1996 to 1997.

The second generation RAV4 was originally offered in a number of trim levels in the UK: NV was front-wheel drive, while NRG, GX, and VX were permanent four-wheel drive with differing levels of equipment. Although the RAV4 was available as a three-door in Europe, Asia and Australia, the American model was only available in a five-door configuration. A 1.8-litre inline-four engine (only with 2WD) producing , 2.0-litre inline-four engine producing , 2.4-litre inline-four engine producing , and a D-4D diesel engine were available. Some RAV4s came with anti-lock braking system, electronic stability control, air conditioning, a height-adjustable driver's seat, cruise control, a six-speaker CD stereo and power windows, mirrors and seats. A sport package added a mesh grille, bonnet scoop, color-keyed door handles, a roof rack, silver sport pedals, heated mirrors, gray-painted bumpers and fender flares, and sport fabric seats. Other options included alloy wheels, heated seats, a sunroof and keyless entry. 16-inch wheels were standard; larger wheels were available on four-wheel drive models.

In Australia, the RAV4 came in base Edge and upmarket Cruiser models in both three- and five-door configurations. The main differentiation between the two models was in appearance. Edge models came with unpainted grey bumpers and side cladding, mirrors, and door handles, and featured steel rims. Cruiser models gained body-colored (painted) bumpers and moldings, mirrors, and door handles, alloy wheels, and ABS brakes. All models came equipped with a brand-new 2.0-litre four-cylinder engine featuring VVT (variable valve timing), resulting in improved power and torque, as well as fuel consumption. Permanent four-wheel drive was a feature. Options were ABS brakes (on the Edge), and air conditioning (on all models). The second generation RAV4 enjoyed success in Australia, where it became the best-selling SUV in the country in 2001, overtaking its rival the Honda CR-V for the first time.

Facelift (2003) 
In late 2003, the 2004 model RAV4 was given a styling update, improved equipment, and, in certain markets, a new engine. In the United States the safety structure was improved and Vehicle Stability Control made standard. Other countries got mostly 5-door models with the 2.0 litre VVT-i engine. Automatic electric air conditioning also became available. European models got a new catalytic converter because of the new European emission policy. The new model also got an electric throttle.

In Australia, for the facelift, the base Edge was renamed CV, and gained standard air conditioning (previously an option). The CV also received painted bumpers, which came in either silver or body-colored shades, depending on the body color. In addition, the model range was given a subtle facelift, consisting largely of a new front bumper with circular fog lights and white turn signals instead of the older orange lights. In 2005, a new "CV Sport" model was added to the range in Australia, which included a non-functional bonnet scoop, giving the RAV4 a more aggressive appearance. The CV Sport model was short-lived, lasting only a year, and was introduced primarily to stimulate sales until the new model arrived in early 2006.

The second generation RAV4 had the highest proportion of female drivers among all makes and models in the United States, with the possible exception of the Volkswagen New Beetle, according to 2003–2004 registration and survey data.

Third generation (XA30; 2005) 

The Toyota RAV4 was redesigned for the 2006 model year, using an all-new platform, and was first unveiled at the 2005 Frankfurt Motor Show. It uses an electric power steering (EPS) system.

The third generation RAV4 is offered in two versions: a short- or a long-wheelbase model. The short-wheelbase model is sold only in Japan, Europe and New Zealand (diesel only in NZ), with the long-wheelbase RAV4 sold in Australia, New Zealand and North America. Since 2007, the extended-length RAV4 is also sold alongside its shorter counterpart in Japan as the Toyota Vanguard, albeit with a revised front-end body work incorporating a revised grille, bumper, bonnet and headlamps. When the larger XA40 arrived in 2012, the short wheelbase model was kept in production for the Japanese market and sold instead of the new version until 2016.

Japanese models went on sale in 2005 at Netz dealers. The 3-door was dropped in the beginning of 2007, leaving Toyota without a mini SUV until the 2009 Urban Cruiser, which is sold in Europe, North America (as the Scion xD) and Japan (as the Toyota ist). The XA30 series RAV4 was sold in Japan until July 2016, where the XA40 is not to be offered. Toyota discontinued the Vanguard in November 2013 in favour of the redesigned XU60 Harrier. The RAV4 continued to grow beyond the "compact car" segment in Japan due to enlarged exterior dimensions and engine displacement, placing it in the upper tax bracket as defined by Japanese government's dimension regulations and annual road tax obligations.

It is also the first generation of RAV4 to be offered in regular length (for Asian and European markets, dropping the spare wheel from the rear) and extended length (for North American and Australian markets) versions. The extended-length version has an additional 21% in interior volume from the last generation, and had an optional third-row for two additional passengers (North America and Japan only). The RAV4 can still be had in either front-wheel drive or four-wheel drive in North America and Japan; however most countries only sell the four-wheel drive version.

In 2008 (for the 2009 model year), the RAV4 was given a mid-cycle refresh in some markets, featuring a number of changes, including an all-new four-cylinder engine, and a redesigned front end and tweaked rear end. The Limited model gets a different front grille and bumper cover from other models. The Sport model features a bigger spoiler and red badging along with an option on the V6 model to have a rear door without the externally mounted spare wheel (run-flat tires are used on this model). New features/options include turn signals integrated into the side mirrors, backup camera (with monitor built into rear-view mirror), satellite navigation, smart keyless entry, a push button starter, a multi-function instrument cluster display, etc. Much of the interior remains as before. In 2009, it was also the first time that the Canadian market received a front-wheel drive model to lower the price of entry.

In 2011 (for the 2012 model year), the RAV4 underwent another facelift, based on the Vanguard's styling.

The vehicles were built in Toyota's Tahara, Aichi assembly plant, and under contract by Toyota Industries in its Nagakusa, Obu, Aichi plant. Beginning in November 2008, vehicles for the North American market were built in the Toyota Motor Manufacturing Canada Inc. at the new West Plant in Woodstock, Ontario. Beginning in March 2009, Chinese models began production by Tianjin FAW Toyota Motor Co. Ltd. in a joint-venture plant in Tianjin, China.

In 2015, the XA30 series RAV4 was awarded the WheelsTV pre-owned vehicle of the year title.

Safety 
The RAV4 in its standard European configuration received 4 stars for adult occupants, 4 stars for toddlers, and 3 stars for pedestrians from Euro NCAP in 2006.

Markets

Japan 

Model ranges include X, G and Sport, replacing RAV4 L and RAV4 J. The X and G can be ordered with either front-wheel drive or four-wheel drive. The Sport model with over fenders is four-wheel drive only. The extended-length RAV4 is sold in Japan as the Toyota Vanguard, released on August 30, 2007. It is sold in five- and seven-passenger versions and slots between the regular RAV4 and Kluger. As it is often the case in Japan-only vehicles, the Vanguard comes loaded with high-tech gadgets, including steering-assisted stability control, keyless entry and satellite navigation. The Vanguard received a facelift in 2010.

Unlike the North American variant that came with a 4-speed automatic gearbox, the Japanese RAV4 (or Vanguard) came with a simulated 7-speed transmission from the K112 line also known as Super CVT-i Sports Sequential Shiftmatic.

Australia 
In Australia, the RAV4 is sold in four-cylinder base CV, Cruiser, Cruiser L and the limited edition "Altitude" trim levels, and CV6, SX6, and ZR6 are 6-cylinder variants. The V6 was available from 2007.

Malaysia 
In Malaysia, the 2.0-litre and 2.4-litre automatic variant is available, both in X and G trim. This model uses the 1AZ-FE four-cylinder, inline 16-valve engine with DOHC and VVT-i. Both the RAV4 and the Vanguard was available through general importers, but not officially sold by UMW Toyota Motor.

Middle East 
In the Middle East, the RAV4 is available with a 2.4-litre engine. Most markets, including the United Arab Emirates (UAE) and Kingdom of Saudi Arabia (KSA), get the four-wheel drive model with an automatic gearbox, but KSA additionally gets a two-wheel-drive model as well, the base one with a manual gearbox.

North America 
North American models include choices of 2.4-litre 2AZ-FE inline-four or 3.5-litre 2GR-FE V6 engine. The V6 model has . In model year 2009, a slightly larger  2.5-litre 2AR-FE inline-four replaced the previous  2.4-litre engine. Either four-cylinder engine came equipped with a four-speed automatic transmission. The North American RAV4 with 3.5-litre 2GR-FE V6 engine is fitted with a five-speed automatic transmission. All US models feature Toyota's Star Safety System which includes Vehicle Stability Control. The new RAV4 topped Toyota SUV sales in the United States for the first time.

No manual transmission or diesel engines are available on North American models.

Facelifted for the 2009 model year, North American models include the choice of a new 2AR-FE inline-four or 2GR-FE V6 engine.

Mexico 
The RAV4 was first introduced in 2004; and was only available in two trim levels: Base and L. This was already an outgoing generation but still sold pretty well and both came in 2WD only and both models had, as standard equipment 16-inch alloy wheels and a roof rack. The new generation RAV4, which is the current model, had more features as standard equipment. Base and Limited trims continue to be available, but on the Limited trim 4WD became an option and the Base model added 17-inch steel wheels but the roof rack was still standard in both trims. For the refresh of 2009 the roof rack in the Base model was eliminated as standard equipment and the Sport trim was added to the line-up. Up to 2008MY all RAV4s in Mexico had four-cylinder engines but for 2009 the Sport model became available with the V6 engine, although the four-cylinder engine was still available. The Limited trim was only available with the V6 engine and four-wheel drive. For 2010, the RAV4 in Mexico has been simplified again to two trims but the Limited trim was dropped and consequently removed the four-wheel drive option, while the Base and Sport trims remained unchanged from 2009. The RAV4 in Mexico has experienced good acceptance since its introduction.

China 
The XA30 RAV4 commenced production in China in April 2009. Trim levels were the 2.0 Classic, 2.0 Luxury, 2.0 Luxury Navi, 2.4 Luxury and 2.4 Luxury Navi. The 2.0-litre 1AZ-FE and 2.4-litre 2AZ-FE were standard paired to a 5 speed manual and 4 speed automatic gearbox.

The China-specific model had different styling compared to the those sold in other countries, with a black strip that was placed in between the radiator and license plate like a moustache. It also had chrome bars below the front and rear bumpers. The license plate was also moved to the bottom bumper area to make way for the RAV4 logo and a rear foglamp. Front and rear parking sensors are also standard.

First facelift

Second facelift

Body styles

Engines

First facelift

RAV4 EV 

Toyota worked together with Tesla Motors to develop the second generation RAV4 EV, and the electric SUV was scheduled for market launch late in the third quarter of 2012. Production was limited to 2,600 units during the first three years, and sales were limited to California only, beginning with the San Francisco Bay Area, Los Angeles/Orange County and San Diego.

The RAV4 EV battery pack and electronic components are similar to those used in the Tesla Model S sedan launched in June 2012, because Tesla Motors is the manufacturer of the powertrain.

Fourth generation (XA40; 2012) 

The fourth generation RAV4 was a complete redesign; it was revealed at the November 2012 Los Angeles Auto Show. Unlike the previous generations, it featured a rear liftgate rather than a side-opening rear door and no longer had the spare wheel mounted on the rear door.

The RAV4 no longer offers a V6 engine like the previous generation—all engine choices were inline four-cylinder engines. Also, while the previous XA30 model was offered in regular and extended wheelbase lengths, the XA40 was only sold in a single wheelbase length (corresponding to the long wheelbase XA30).

The full hybrid system combined a 2.5-litre Atkinson cycle petrol engine with an electric motor, a high voltage generator, a 204 cell nickel–metal hydride battery located under the rear seats, a power control unit, and a power split device. RAV4 Hybrids were available in both front and four-wheel drive variants. The four-wheel drive came equipped with a second, 50 kW high-voltage, a rear-mounted electric motor that offers increased traction and a  towing capacity. The rear's electric motor operates independently from the hybrid system front's electric motor, driving the rear wheels alone.
US sales began in early January 2013.

Markets 
For the Japanese market, the previous generation in short-wheelbase length remained on sale in Japan until 2016 instead of the newer, export only, XA40. The Harrier replaced the long-wheelbase model in Japan, previously badged as the Vanguard.

In Australia, the fourth generation RAV4 went on sale in February 2013. Engine choices included a 2.0- and 2.5-litre four-cylinder petrol, and 2.0- and 2.2-litre turbo-diesels. Transmissions included a six-speed manual (UK/Australia only), Continuously Variable Transmission (CVT), and six-speed automatic.

The UK model went on sale in 2013. Early European models included a choice of a 2.0-litre petrol or one of three 2.0-litre diesel engines.

The RAV4 manufactured in Woodstock, Ontario, Canada had about 50 percent of its parts coming from Japan.

Taiwanese models included a 2.0-litre Dual VVT-i inline four-cylinder engine with CVT or 2.5-litre Dual VVT-i inline-four engine with six-speed automatic.

Production in China commenced in August 2013 and was sold alongside the XA30 model for a short time. The XA40 RAV4 in China came standard with the 2 litre 6ZR-FE and 2.5 litre 5AR-FE petrol engine. 6 speed manual, automatic and CVT gearboxes are standard. Seven trim levels were available with prices ranging from 183,800 to 272,800 yuan (US$25,680 to 38,120).

Production in Russia started in August 2016.

Facelift (2015) 
In 2015, for the 2016 model year, Toyota released a facelift for the XA40 series. The facelift debuted with the RAV4 Hybrid shown at the April 2015 New York International Auto Show. The facelift included redesigned LED front and rear lamps and updated speedometer dials with full color TFT multi information display.

RAV4 Adventure and RAV4 Premium (2013) 

The RAV4 Adventure is a concept vehicle that accentuated the car's look to reinforce its off-road capabilities. It included dark red body color, extended wheel arches, 20-inch alloy wheels and matte painted front and rear bumpers.

The RAV4 Premium is a concept vehicle with Deep Bronze body color, bumpers in Deep Bronze, chrome-finished spoiler, chrome inserts in the rear bumper, brushed aluminium skid plates, integrated tailpipe at the rear bumper, 20-inch wheels, leather interior upholstery designed by Toyota's Kansei design department, seats with black piping and V-shaped outline, two-tone double stitching and grey and black leather on the instrument panel and door panels.

Both vehicles were unveiled in March 2013 at the Geneva Motor Show.

A production version of the RAV4 Adventure was added to the US lineup in September 2017.

Engines

Safety 

The Japan--made RAV4 in its most basic Latin American configuration with 3 airbags received 5 stars for adult occupant and 4 stars for toddlers from Latin NCAP in 2015.

The RAV4 in its standard European configuration received 5 stars from Euro NCAP in 2013.

In the Insurance Institute for Highway Safety (IIHS) evaluations, the 2013 and 2014 model year RAV4 achieved a "good" crashworthiness rating for head restraints and seats, roof strength, side, and moderate overlap front, while achieving a "poor" rating in the IIHS Small Overlap Frontal Test. Modifications were made starting in the 2015 model year which increased the small overlap front rating to "good".

The small overlap test, introduced in 2012 by the IIHS, simulates a frontal collision on 25 percent of the driver's side. Since its adoption, the IIHS has noticed several automakers making non-symmetrical modifications to their vehicles, including the RAV4. Another small overlap test was conducted on a number of vehicles, including a 2015 RAV4, but was conducted on the passenger side instead. The RAV4 fared the worst and would have received a "poor" rating if the IIHS were to provide ratings for passenger-side protection. The crash test's intrusion was  further into the vehicle on the passenger's side than on the driver's side and caused the passenger door to open during the crash.

Fifth generation (XA50; 2018) 

The fifth-generation RAV4 was unveiled at the March 2018 New York International Auto Show. The design was previewed by the FT-AC concept shown at the December 2017 Los Angeles Auto Show. It is built on the same TNGA-K (GA-K) platform as the XV70 series Camry. Both 4-cylinder petrol-powered and petrol-electric hybrid (Hybrid Synergy Drive) variants would remain available.

Development of the model was led by chief engineer Yoshikazu Saeki. Built on the GA-K platform, the unibody chassis of the fifth-generation RAV4 is 57 percent more rigid than the previous generation. The model incorporates a multi-link rear suspension to which is claimed to provide more ideal damping for handling, lesser interior cabin noise, and enhanced ride comfort.

For improved forward visibility around the A-pillar, Toyota positioned the side mirrors lower on the doors. The lowered beltline and the enlarged rear quarter glass also increased the side visibility from inside the car. Forward visibility is also enhanced by the positioning of the lower instrument panel and tucked-in windshield wipers.

The fifth-generation RAV4 also introduced a newly developed four-wheel drive system, marketed as "Dynamic Torque Vectoring AWD". Claimed to be a world-first adoption, it is a torque vectoring type, which independently distributes torque to the left and right rear wheels according to driving conditions. A disconnect mechanism, marketed as "Rear Driveline Disconnect", is incorporated to transmit driving force only to the front wheels when 4WD is deemed unnecessary.

For hybrid models, all-wheel drive model utilized the "E-Four"/"AWD-i" system. The updated system increases the total torque to the electronically driven rear wheels by 30 percent compared to the AWD system used in the previous generation. A new control system allows torque distribution to the front and rear wheels to be changed from between 100:0 to 20:80. A standard AWD system without torque vectoring is also available for petrol models.

Markets

North America 
The RAV4 went on sale in the United States in December 2018, while the RAV4 Hybrid went on sale in March 2019. It is available in five petrol trim levels which include the LE, XLE, XLE Premium, Adventure and Limited, and four hybrid trim levels which include the LE, XLE, XSE and Limited. Both Adventure and Limited grades are equipped with Dynamic Torque Vectoring AWD. It has Multi Terrain Select providing operators an ability to maximize traction when driving on sand, mud, rock, or dirt. North American market RAV4 is equipped with a 2.5-litre petrol engine paired with an 8-speed Direct Shift automatic. A 7-inch multi-touch screen is available standard, as well as the Toyota Safety Sense 2.0.

For the North American market, the RAV4 is built in two plants in Ontario, Canada, while the RAV4 Hybrid is produced in Georgetown, Kentucky, United States. The RAV4 Prime plug-in hybrid is imported from the Nagakusa plant in Japan.

In 2019, for the 2020 model year, the TRD Off-Road trim level was added to the lineup, making a total of ten trim levels available. In 2020, for the 2021 model year the XLE Premium Hybrid trim level is added to the lineup. Toyota also added new TRD-stamped stainless steel front skid plate for the TRD Off-Road. The SE Hybrid grade is added in 2021 for the 2022 model year. The Woodland Edition model was added in 2022 for the 2023 model year with standard hybrid powertrain, TRD bronze-coloured wheels, and roof rails. For the 2023 model, all RAV4 trims also received upgrade to Toyota Safety Sense 2.5.

Europe 
In the United Kingdom, the fifth-generation RAV4 is available exclusively in its hybrid version, either front-wheel drive or with four-wheel drive. It is available in four grades — Icon, Design, Excel and Dynamic. Ireland was the first market to release the Hybrid version of the fifth-generation RAV4 with delivery in late December 2018.

The GR Sport grade was added in October 2022.

Japan 
The fifth-generation RAV4 was unveiled in Japan in February 2019, and went on sale in April 2019. It marked the reintroduction of the RAV4 nameplate in Japan after almost three years of hiatus. Monthly sales target in Japan was set at 3,000 units, while grade levels available during launch are X, G, "Z package", Adventure, Hybrid X, and Hybrid G. Until 2020, the model was only available in Corolla Store and Netz dealership chains. The plug-in hybrid version called the RAV4 PHV was added in June 2020.

Southeast Asia 
The fifth-generation RAV4 was also launched in Singapore on 10 January 2019 at the Singapore Motorshow and in the Philippines on 8 February 2019.

In Malaysia, the fifth-generation RAV4 was launched in the country on 18 June 2020 and available in 2 engine options, the 2.0 M20A-FKS and 2.5 A25A-FKS, both in single trim only. As of August 2020, the 2.0-litre engine option was dropped.

South Africa 
The fifth-generation RAV4 has been available in South Africa since March 2019 in five variants: 2.0 GX 2WD, 2.0 GX CVT 2WD, 2.0 GX-R CVT AWD, 2.5 VX CVT 2WD and 2.5 VX AT AWD, with the 2.5 GX Hybrid available since September 2021. The 2.0 GX 2WD trim is also available with 6-speed manual transmission. As of March 2022, the GX Hybrid was dropped in favour of the facelifted GX-R and VX e-Four Hybrids.

Australia 
The fifth-generation RAV4 went on sale in Australia on 8 May 2019 and is available in four trim levels: GX, GXL, Cruiser and Edge. The GX, GXL and Cruiser trims have two engine options: the 2.0 L petrol and the 2.5 L hybrid, while the Edge trim has only one engine option: the 2.5 L petrol. The GX trim is available with either 6-speed manual transmission or CVT, while the GXL and Cruiser trims as well as the GX, GXL and Cruiser hybrid variants are only available with CVT. The Edge trim is available with 8-speed automatic transmission.

China 
The fifth-generation RAV4 was also launched in China on 22 November 2019 at the Guangzhou International Motor Show. It is produced and sold by FAW Toyota. Another Chinese market variant with different front and rear fascias produced and sold by GAC Toyota is called the Toyota Wildlander. The PHEV version of the Wildlander was unveiled on 19 April 2021.

RAV4 Hybrid 

A hybrid variant of the RAV4 was announced available alongside the standard petrol variant and made available in March 2019. It comes standard with four-wheel drive and the hybrid system uses a 1.6 kWh nickel-metal-hydride battery pack. Fuel economy is estimated by the EPA in to be:

 city: 
 highway: 
 combined: .

Plug-in hybrid electric 

A plug-in hybrid electric (PHEV) variant of the RAV4 was unveiled at the December 2019 Los Angeles Auto Show.

The sales have begun in Japan since 8 June 2020, initially sold as the RAV4 PHV. The "PHV" moniker was later dropped in October 2022.

2021 refresh 
In September 2021, Toyota revealed the updated RAV4 with new LED projector type headlights, alloy wheels which can be had in either silver or black, USB-C charging ports, while the European market gains the new Adventure variant which has been offered in other markets like Japan, United States and Australia.

RAV4 GR Sport 
In October 2022, the Toyota RAV4 GR Sport was launched in Europe with a firmer suspension, a sportier look and new 19-inch wheels.

Suzuki Across 

A Suzuki-badged version of the RAV4 PHEV called Suzuki Across was introduced in July 2020, exclusively for the European market. The model was introduced to help Suzuki meet fleet-wide average  emission targets in the European Union in 2021, as the Across offers a low   emission figure. The Suzuki variant receives slim LED headlights, which appear to be identical to the Chinese market Toyota Wildlander, and a rounder front grille that differentiates the Across from the Toyota RAV4.

2022 update 
The Suzuki Across received a minor update in November 2022, receiving the new touchscreen infotainment and digital instrument cluster from the facelifted Toyota RAV4.

Mitsuoka Buddy 

An aftermarket modified version of the RAV4, the Mitsuoka Buddy, made its debut in October 2020 for Japan only. The front fascia harkens back to the Chevrolet K5 Blazer and the rear is similar to the Cadillac cars of the 1970s. Engine options are 2.0-litre petrol and 2.5-litre hybrid.

Powertrain

Safety 
In September 2019, Teknikens Värld ran both the petrol and hybrid versions of the RAV4 on the moose test, where both vehicles failed. The testers noted "dangerous behavior" on the cone course, and that the electronic stability control "engaged very late", causing both vehicles to hop up on their outer tyres multiple times during the test. In response to the findings, Toyota issued a software update. In January 2020, Teknikens Värld retested the model giving it a passing mark.

The Japan-made RAV4 in its most basic Latin American configuration with 7 airbags received 5 stars for adult occupants, 5 stars for toddlers and Advanced Award from Latin NCAP in 2019.

The RAV4 in its standard European configuration received 5 stars from Euro NCAP in 2019.

Sales

References

External links 

 
 blog.toyota.co.uk : Vehicles : RAV4 History (official site)

RAV4
Cars introduced in 1994
2000s cars
2010s cars
2020s cars
Compact sport utility vehicles
Crossover sport utility vehicles
Front-wheel-drive vehicles
All-wheel-drive vehicles
Hybrid sport utility vehicles
Plug-in hybrid vehicles
Partial zero-emissions vehicles
Vehicles with CVT transmission
Motor vehicles manufactured in the United States
Euro NCAP small off-road
Latin NCAP small off-road